Eleanor or Leanor of Aragon may refer to:
 Infantas of Aragon: 
 Eleanor of Aragon, Countess of Toulouse (1182–1226), daughter of Alfonso II of Aragon
 Eleanor of Aragon (b. 1251), daughter of James I of Aragon
 Eleanor of Aragon, Queen of Cyprus (1333–1417), daughter of Infante Pedro, Count of Ribagorza, Ampurias and Prades
 Eleanor of Aragon (1346–1405), daughter of John, Duke of Randazzo
 Eleanor of Aragon, Queen of Castile (1358–1382), daughter of Peter IV of Aragon
 Eleanor of Aragon (1393–1393), daughter of John I of Aragon
 Eleanor of Aragon, Queen of Portugal (1402–1445), daughter of Ferdinand I of Aragon
 , daughter of Alfonso V of Aragon, married in 1444 Marino Marziano, Prince of Rossano
 Infantas of Aragon known by other regions: 
 Eleanor of Provence (1223–1291), daughter of Ramon Berenguer IV, Count of Provence
 Eleanor of Naples (1450–1493), daughter of Ferdinand I of Naples
 Eleanor of Navarre (1426–1479), daughter of John II of Aragon
 Eleanor of Austria (1498–1558), daughter of Joanna I of Aragon
 Four queen consorts of Aragon: 
 Eleanor of Castile (died 1244), wife of James I of Aragon
 Eleanor of Castile (1307–1359), wife of Alfonso IV of Aragon
 Eleanor of Sicily, wife of Peter IV of Aragon
 Eleanor of Alburquerque, wife of Ferdinand I of Aragon